Val Williams is a British curator and author who has become an authority on British photography. She is the Professor of the History and Culture of Photography at the London College of Communication, part of the University of the Arts London, and was formerly the Curator of Exhibitions and Collections at the Hasselblad Center.

Life and work
Williams has curated the work of Martin Parr and Daniel Meadows. She "has championed Meadows' work for years even as most British institutions have ignored it". Williams curated the influential Tate Britain show How We Are: Photographing Britain. She has also written on the representation of women, and work by women photographers. Her photographic archive is held at the Library of Birmingham.

Exhibitions curated
How We Are: Photographing Britain, Tate Britain, London, 2007. Curated by Williams and Susan Bright.
Soho Nights, The Photographers' Gallery, London, 2008/2009. Curated by Williams and Bob Pullen. "Part of an ongoing series of linked exhibitions taken from the gallery's archives."

Publications

Books by Williams
Women Photographers.
Women Photographers: The Other Observers, 1900 to the Present. London: Virago, 1986. 
The Other Observers: Women Photographers in Britain 1900 to the Present. London Virago, 1994. .
Ida Kar: Photographer, 1908-1974. London Virago, 1990. .
..Who's looking at the family?. London: Barbican Art Gallery, 1994. . "Catalogue of an exhibition held at the Barbican Art Gallery, 26th May - 4th Sept., 1994" "an exhibition selected by Val Williams, Carol Brown and Brigitte Lardinois."
 Warworks: Women, Photography and the Iconography of War. London: Virago, 1994. .
The Dead. By Williams and Greg Hobson. Bradford: National Museum of Photography, Film & Television, 1995. . With essays by Williams ("Secret Places"), Hobson ("A Horrible Exhibition"), Elizabeth Edwards ("Seeing How Others Die") and Thomas Lynch ("Embalming Father"); and photographs by Nobuyoshi Araki, Sue Fox, Kasimir Zgorecki, Franco Zecchin, Thomas Werde, Belinda Whiting, Rudolph Schafer, Leslie Hakim-Dowek, Krass Clement, Donigan Cumming, Hans Danuser, Louis Jammes, Max Jourdan, Pete Max Kandhola, Ann Mandelbaum, Bastienne Schmidt, Andres Serrano, John Benjamin Stone, Clare Strand, Annet van der Voort, Nick Waplington, Elizabeth Williams, Neil Winokur, and Xavier Zimbardo. Published to accompany a touring exhibition starting at the National Museum of Photography, Film & Television, October 1995 – January 1996, curated by Williams and Hobson.
Street dreams: contemporary Indian studio photographs from the Satish Sharma Collection. London: Booth-Clibborn, in association with Shoreditch Biennale, 1997. . "Published in conjunction with the ... exhibition ... which opened at Standpoint Gallery, London as part of the 1997 Shoreditch Biennale exhibitions programme".
 Martin Parr
London: Phaidon, 2002. . Hardback.
Martin Parr. Rome: Contrasto, 2002. . Italian-language version.
Berlin: Phaidon, 2008. . German-language version.
London: Phaidon, 2004. . Paperback.
2nd ed. London: Phaidon, 2014. .
Derek Ridgers: When We Were Young: Club and Street Portraits 1978–1987. Brighton: Photoworks, 2005. . Photographs by Derek Ridgers, text by Val Williams. About the emergence of new style cultures in London in the late 1970s and early 1980s.
 Daniel Meadows: Edited Photographs from the 70s and 80s. Brighton: Photoworks, 2011. . Authored by Val Williams. Edited by Val Williams and Gordon MacDonald.
 When Photography Really Works. New York: Barron's Educational Series; London: Quintessence, 2012. .
 What Makes Great Photographs: 80 Masterpieces Explained.
London: Apple, 2012. .
London: Frances Lincoln, 2013. .
Pourquoi est-ce un chef-d'oeuvre? 80 photographies expliquées. Paris: Eyrolles, 2013. . French-language version.
Seaside Photographed. By Williams and Karen Shepherdson. London: Thames & Hudson, 2019. . Published to accompany an exhibition of the same name.

Books edited by Williams
 Daniel Meadows. National Portraits: Photographs from the 1970s. Edited by Williams. Salford: Viewpoint Photography Gallery; Derby: Montage Gallery, 1997. .
Look at Me: Fashion and Photography in Britain 1960-1997. Edited by Williams. London: British Council, 1998. . Catalogue of a touring exhibition curated by Williams and Brett Rodgers.
Magnum Ireland. London: Thames & Hudson, 2005. . Edited by Williams with Brigitte Lardinois.
  Anna Fox Photographs 1983–2007. Brighton: Photoworks, 2005. . Edited by Williams. With texts by David Chandler, Val Williams, Jason Evans and Mieke Bal.
How We Are: Photographing Britain from the 1840s to the Present. Edited and with texts by Williams and Susan Bright. London: Tate, 2007. . With essays by Gerry Badger and Martin Parr, and by Kevin Jackson.
Glyndebourne, a Visual History. London: Quercus, 2009. . Edited by Williams and Brigitte Lardinois. Includes an essay by George Christie.

Notes

References 

Living people
British curators
Photography curators
Photography academics
Year of birth missing (living people)
Place of birth missing (living people)
Academics of the University of the Arts London